The Triptyque Ardennais is a multi-day road cycling race held annually in Belgium since 1959.

No cyclist has won the race more than once.

Winners

References 

Cycle races in Belgium
Recurring sporting events established in 1959
1959 establishments in Belgium